José María Córdova Muñoz, also known as the "Hero of Ayacucho", was a General of the Colombian army during the Independence War of Colombia, Perú, and Bolivia from Spain.

Biographic data 
Córdova was born in Concepción, Antioquia on September 8, 1799. He died in Santuario, Antioquia, on October 17, 1829.

Military career 

Córdova's military career began in 1814, when he joined the newly formed Engineer Corps in the province of Antioquia, which had just been established by Francisco José de Caldas in Medellín. Cordova's interest in the military and the revolutionary cause had been stoked by the Colombian declaration of independence, as well as Antioquia's own declaration of independence as the "Republic of Antioquia" or the "Free and Sovereign State of Antioquia." In 1815, Córdova then also enrolled in the revolutionary army and was sent to Tunja.  There he was appointed second lieutenant and fought under the French Colonel Emanuel Roergas Serviez, who became his mentor. Córdova's battalion assisted in the victory of the battle of “Río Palo” and Cordova himself rose to the rank of Lieutenant, when he was only 16 years old

Once the counter offensive by the Spanish troops began in 1815, Serviez was appointed as commander in chief of the Army, while Córdova continued to serve under him. In 1816, Serviez's forces, including Córdova's battalion, were defeated and forced to retreat to the Llanos Orientales. There, General Serviez was assassinated, presumably under orders from José Antonio Páez. Córdova himself was court martialed for desertion, but avoided execution, and was subsequently restored to his rank.  He was then given a command post before Simón Bolívar's arrival to Venezuela in 1816. Córdova was then sent to the Guayana Region in 1817, and Bolivar later incorporated him in his senior staff. 

In 1819, soon after the Battle of Boyacá, General Bolívar promoted Córdova to the rank of General and commissioned him to expel the Spanish forces from the province of Antioquia. The Spanish army of General Barreiro had been demolished at Boyacá, and Córdova’s mission was to prevent the regrouping of the Spanish forces in northern Colombia. Córdova embarked on his mission with 190 soldiers, arriving in Rionegro on August 25 and in Medellín on August 30.

Once there, Córdova became the Military Chief of Antioquia, while José Manuel Restrepo was named as the Civilian Chief in charge of the public administration. Córdova organized a small army of 700 volunteers, and on February 12, 1820, he defeated the Spanish army of General Warleta at the “Battle of Chorros Blancos”, in Yarumal, Antioquia. This victory marked the end of the presence of Spanish troops in Antioquia.

Having completed his mission in Antioquia, Córdova then took his the participated in the battle for Cartagena in 1821, commanding his own Antioquia Battalion. After that, Córdova was order by Bolivar to join the Southern Campaign and headed to Ecuador, where he participated with distinction in the Battle of Pichincha in 1822.

In 1824, having already been named Brigadier General, Córdova was sent to Peru to join with General Antonio José de Sucre, to defeat royalist forces under the Viceroy José de la Serna. In the Battle of Ayacucho, Córdova was given command of the first division of the army, and thanks to his distinguished service he earned the nickname "The Lion of Ayacucho". This victory confirmed Peruvian Independence, and led to the recognition of the independence of the South American states by England, France and the United States of America. Córdova continued south into Bolivia, and commanded the newly formed armed forces in the country during the formation of the government, and remained through 1827.

Córdova's death

Córdova returned to Antioquia after the military campaign to liberate Perú on September 8, 1829. He had clearly expressed his opposition and discontent with General Simón Bolívar proclamation as Dictator of Colombia and he was under investigation for the conspiracy of the "Noche Septembrina" of September 25, 1828. His discontentment with Bolivar's actions, led Córdova to organize a revolt against Bolívar in Antioquia.

In response to Cordova's rebellion, Irish General Daniel Florence O'Leary was commissioned by Bolivar to render Cordova. The ensuing battle took place near El Santuario, Antioquia, where Córdova died by the hand of the Irish Commander Rupert Hand, on the 17th of October, 1829.  

As homage for his actions and in his memory the department of Córdova in Colombia, the Colombian army's military officer's academy and the Medellin International Airport in Rionegro are all named after him.

References

External links
 Luis Angel Arango Library; José María Córdoba
 Colombialink.com - José María Córdoba/Córdova biography
 Villegas editores - José María Córdova
 Latin American studies; Antonio José de Sucre, el Gran Mariscal de Ayacucho

1799 births
1829 deaths
Colombian generals
People from Antioquia Department